97 Field Regiment is part of the Regiment of Artillery of the Indian Army.

Formation and history
The regiment was raised as 97 Composite Regiment on 1 August 1963 at Namkum, Ranchi district. The first commanding officer was Lieutenant Colonel Jagjit Singh and the unit was equipped with 3.7 inch howitzers and 120 mm Brandt mortars. The regiment was subsequently converted to a mountain regiment, a field regiment and a medium regiment. It is presently designated back as a field regiment. 

It has used varied equipment including 3.7 inch howitzers, 120 mm mortars, 25-pounders, 75/24 Pack Howitzers, 105/37 mm Indian field guns, 105/37 mm light field guns and the 155/45 mm Soltam guns (which is a 155 mm upgraded version of M-46 Field Gun by Soltam Systems).

Class composition
The regiment is a single class regiment with Ahir troops.

Operations
The regiment has taken part in the following operations –
 Indo-Pakistani War of 1965
The regiment took part in Operation Ablaze.
Nathu La and Cho La clashes

97 Field Regiment lost six soldiers in the Nathu La clashes in September 1967 with the Chinese People's Liberation Army (PLA). Gunner Ram Kewal, Gunner Rangaraj Naidu, Lance Naik Nitya Nand, Gunner Satbir Singh and Gunner Jai Singh were killed on 13 September 1967 and Gunner Jagat Singh on 14 September 1967.
Indo-Pakistani War of 1971
97 Mountain Regiment equipped with 75/24 Pack Howitzers saw action during Operation Cactus Lily in the Eastern Sector. It saw action in the North Western sector of the Bangladesh liberation. It was part of the 340 Mountain Brigade Group (of 20 Mountain Division under XXXIII Corps). The unit also took part in the Battle of Hilli (or Battle of Bogura).
During the operations, Gunner (ORA) Dudh Nath was awarded the Sena Medal. Gunner Jag Ram was killed in action.
Internal security duties
The regiment was involved in providing support to the civil authorities during the 1979 riots in Jamshedpur. It was awarded one Shaurya Chakra and one Chief of Army Staff Commendation Card. 
Counterterrorism operations
The regiment was involved in counterterrorism operations in Assam as part of Operation Rhino and during Operation Rakshak between 2014-17. Captain Pramod Raghavendra Jalwadi of the unit was killed in Awantipora in October 2006.

Other operations
Operation Parakram 
Operation Meghdoot

Gallantry awards

The regiment has won the following gallantry awards  –
Shaurya Chakra – 1 (Captain Subir Kumar Mookerjee)
Sena Medal – 3
Mentioned in despatches – 1
Commendation cards – 4
Chief of Army Staff Unit Citation in 2018 for Operation Rakshak during 2014-17.
Governor of Arunachal Pradesh Unit Citation in September 2022.

See also
List of artillery regiments of Indian Army

References

Military units and formations established in 1963
Artillery regiments of the Indian Army after 1947
Indian Army